Aliza is a feminine given name. Notable people with the name include:

Aliza Bin-Noun, Israeli diplomat
Aliza Green, American chef and writer
Aliza Greenblatt (1888–1975), American poet
Aliza Gur, American actress
Aliza Kezeradze (1937–1996), Georgian classical pianist
Aliza Lavie (born 1964), Israeli academic and politician
Aliza Olmert (born 1946), Israeli artist, photographer, writer and social worker
Aliza Sherman, American writer
Aliza Vellani (born 1991), Canadian actress

Feminine given names